Let Me Go On is the second EP by Seabird.  The EP was the result of several months recording material after the band had been signed to Credential Recordings from EMI in 2006.  It was released on December 18, 2007, and was used as a teaser for their 2008 debut, 'Til We See the Shore.

Track listing
 "Let Me Go On" – 3:59
 "Not Alone" – 3:40
 "Stronger" – 3:18
 "Let Me Go On (Olaj's "Let Me Go Off" Mix)" – 4:09

References

2007 EPs
Seabird (band) albums
Credential Recordings EPs